The Ormur, also called Burki or Baraki, are an Eastern Iranic people mainly living in Baraki Barak, Logar, Afghanistan and in Kaniguram, South Waziristan.

Despite speaking their own distinct Eastern Iranian languages, called Ormuri, the Ormur are part of the Pashtun tribal system and identify with the Karlan confederacy of the region. The Pashtun warrior-poet Pir Roshan, born in 1525 in Jalandhar, India, belonged to the Ormur tribe. He moved with his family to their ancestral homeland of Kaniguram in Waziristan, from where he led the Roshani movement against the Mughal Empire.

Language and demographics
Ormuri is the first language of the Ormurs living in Kaniguram and its vicinity in South Waziristan; today, all are bilingual in the local Pashto dialect of Waziristani (Maseedwola).

They are also found in Baraki Barak in Logar and in the outskirts of Ghazni in Afghanistan. However, Pashto and Dari have replaced Ormuri language there.

Notable personalities

Religion
Bayazid Pir Roshan, Pashtun Warrior/Intellectual, founder Roshaniyya (Enlightenment) movement. Descendants comprise the "Baba Khel" branch of the Burki Qaum (tribe).

Military

Air Chief Marshal Farooq Feroze Khan (Danishmand)- Chairman Joint Chiefs of Staff Committee and Chairman of the Pakistan International Airlines.

See also
 Faqir of Ipi

References

Further reading 
Sufi Illuminati: The Rawshani Movement in Muslim Mysticism, Society and Politics by Sergei Andreyev Publisher: Routledge 
The Rawshaniyya: Sufi movement in the Mughal tribal periphery, in Late Classical Sufism. (Curzon Persian Art & Culture) (Hardcover) Sergei Andreyev

Warrior Race – Imran Khan – Butler & Tanner Ltd 
Olaf Caroe, The Pathans
Roshaniya movement and the Khan Rebellion – Author: Yury V. Bosin
Punjab Notes and Queries Volume II, Page 160 (History of Bayezid) Desiples of Sheikh Bazid – Pathans of Mastwi – Tirah (FYI)
Joseph von Hammer-Purgstall – Geschichte der Assassinen
Dabistan of Mohsani Fani (Translated by Leyden, 11th Volume of the Asiatic Researches (Pages 406, 407, 420 (Ala Dad))
Memoirs of the Saints, translated by Dr. Bankley Behari
Rawshaniyya movement ... Reprinted from Abr-Nahrain, by Saiyid Athar Abbas Rizvi (Author) ASIN: B0017UJT6S
The beginning of Pashtun written culture and the Rawshaniyyah movement, in Proceedings of the Third European Conference of Iranian Studies, Cambridge University Press, Cambridge, to be published in 1999
Religious factor in the traditional Pashtun warfare, in Proceedings of the International Conference on Weaponry and Warfare in Historical and Social Perspective, Hermitage Press, St Petersburg, 1998, pp. 55–59
Uwaysi Aspects in the Rawshani Doctrine, in Central Asia and the Eastern Hindukush. Countries and Peoples of the East journal, vol. XXXII, St Petersburg, 1998, pp. 137–148
The Rawshaniyya; Millenarian Sufi Movement in the Mughal Tribal Periphery, in Persianate Sufism in the Safavid and Mughal Period. An International Conference on Late Classical Sufism, London 19–21 May 1997, Abstracts, pp. 7–8
British Indian Views of the Later Followers of the Rawshaniyya, Nineteenth and Twentieth Centuries, in Iran, vol. XXII, London, 1994, pp. 135–138
Turmoil on the Roof of the World, in Central Asia and the Caucuses in World Affairs, Hastings, 1993, pp. 1–5
Notes on the Ormur People, in St Petersburg Journal of Oriental Studies, vol. IV, St Petersburg, 1993, pp. 230–238
On a Little-Known Rawshani Source, in: Man, Culture, Philosophy, The Urals University Press, Yekaterinburg, 1992, pp. 335–349 (In Russian)
Two Rawshani Sources on Five Pillars of Islam, in: St Petersburg Journal of Oriental Studies, vol. I, St Petersburg, 1992, pp. 380–384 (in Russian)

Waziristan
Ethnic groups in Logar Province
Ethnic groups in Afghanistan
Social groups of Khyber Pakhtunkhwa
Social groups of Punjab, Pakistan
Ethnic groups in Pakistan
Karlani Pashtun tribes